Catocala pirata is a moth of the family Erebidae. It is found in the Russian Far East (Primorye) and North Korea.

The wingspan is about 43 mm.

References

External links
Catocala of Asia

pirata
Moths of Korea
Moths of Asia
Moths described in 1904